The 2016–17 Martinique Championnat National was the 97th season of the Championnat National, top division of football in Martinique. The season began on 9 September 2016 and will end on 13 May 2017.

Clubs 

Fourteen clubs participated in the Championnat National during the 2016-17 campaign. New Club, Eucalyptus and Diamantinoise were promoted from the second division.

Table 

The point system is four points for a win, two for a draw and one for a loss.

References

External links 
Martinique Championnat National (French)

2016-17
Martinique
football
football